Diamond is the fourth album by American hardcore punk band Stick to Your Guns.

Background
The album was announced accompanying the release of a new song supporting the Occupy Wall Street movement, "Bringing You Down (A New World Overthrow)", which was re-recorded for the album. On February 10, 2012, they released a video on YouTube announcing that their new album would be titled Diamond and would be released on March 27, 2012. On February 20, a new song named "Against Them All" was released on iTunes and through the Sumerian Records YouTube account. The video for "We Still Believe" premiered on March 21 and is the official lead single from Diamond. A video for an acoustic live version of the song was also released the same day.

A limited vinyl edition of the album, labeled as Decade Edition, was released in 2014 to commemorate the 10th anniversary of the band. This edition, including 3 bonus tracks, was only available at the band's merchandise table on the "Fuck the Message" Tour and was limited to 1,000 copies. This edition was later available for digital download.

Track listing

Personnel
 Jesse Barnett – lead vocals, piano, additional guitars, lyrics, acoustic guitar on "We Still Believe" (acoustic version)
 Josh James – lead guitar, backing vocals, vocals on "Empty Heads"
 Chris Rawson – rhythm guitar, backing vocals, vocals on "Empty Heads"
 Andrew Rose – bass, backing vocals
 George Schmitz – drums
 Nick Diamond - Design

Additional personnel
 Carl Schwartz from First Blood – guest vocals on "Bringing You Down"

References

2012 albums
Stick to Your Guns (band) albums
Sumerian Records albums
Albums produced by Bill Stevenson (musician)